XHYZ-FM is a radio station serving the state of Aguascalientes, broadcasting on 107.7 MHz. XHYZ is owned by Radiogrupo and carries a Regional Mexican format known as La Poderosa.

History
XEYZ-AM received its concession on January 2, 1950. It was owned by Radiodifusión del Centro, S.A., and broadcast on 1450 kHz, with 100 watts. In 1985, XEYZ slid down the dial to 1260 kHz.

Radio y Publicidad de Aguascalientes bought XEYZ in 1993. It converted the station to an AM-FM combo the next year. In the early 2000s, XEYZ moved to 1130 kHz, allowing a power increase to 10,000 watts.

On May 9, 2018, the AM frequency was surrendered.

References

Regional Mexican radio stations
Radio stations in Aguascalientes
Mass media in Aguascalientes City